Barrio Sur is a corregimiento in Colón District, Colón Province, Panama with a population of 14,076 as of 2010. Its population as of 1990 was 24,269; its population as of 2000 was 17,787.

References

Corregimientos of Colón Province